Yumaklı is a village in the Çerkeş District of Çankırı Province in Turkey. Its population is 120 (2021).

References

Villages in Çerkeş District